Run-in period is a period between the recruitment and randomization phases of a clinical trial, when all participants receive the same treatment, which may be active treatment, a placebo or no treatment at all. The clinical data from this stage of a trial are only occasionally of value but can serve a valuable role in screening out ineligible or non-compliant participants, in ensuring that participants are in a stable condition, and in providing baseline observations. A run-in period is sometimes called a washout period if treatments that participants were using before entering the clinical trial are discontinued.

See also
Data management
Randomized controlled trial
Regulatory requirement
Safety monitoring
Serious adverse event
Standard operating procedures
Standard treatment
Study population

References

Clinical research